Qilin is a town situated in the west of Zongyang, Anhui Province, a landlocked province in eastern China.

References

Towns in Anhui
Anqing